Ruchi (also Romanized as Rūchī; also known as Ruchīn) is a village in Zibad Rural District, Kakhk District, Gonabad County, Razavi Khorasan Province, Iran. At the 2011 census, its population was 600, in 151 families.

References 

Davood ghanbari

Populated places in Gonabad County